Mohamed Camara Yali-Yali (born 16 March 1985) is a Guinean former footballer. He spent one season with Belgian side Lokeren, and also played in Saudi Arabia with Al-Watani.

Career statistics

Club

Notes

References

1984 births
Living people
Guinean footballers
Association football midfielders
Belgian Pro League players
Satellite FC players
K.S.C. Lokeren Oost-Vlaanderen players
Al-Watani Club players
Horoya AC players
Guinean expatriate footballers
Guinean expatriate sportspeople in Belgium
Expatriate footballers in Belgium
Guinean expatriate sportspeople in Saudi Arabia
Expatriate footballers in Saudi Arabia